Dr. Theodore Shedlovsky (October 29, 1898 – November 5, 1976) was a Russian-born American chemist, a member of the National Academy of Sciences, noted for his work of applying electrochemistry to life processes and living cells.

He is the author of Electrochemistry in Biology and Medicine (New York: Wiley, 1955).

References 

1898 births
1976 deaths
20th-century American chemists
Members of the United States National Academy of Sciences
Emigrants from the Russian Empire to the United States